A traffic separation scheme or TSS is a maritime traffic-management route-system ruled by the International Maritime Organization or IMO.
The traffic-lanes (or clearways) indicate the general direction of the ships in that zone; ships navigating within a TSS all sail in the same direction or they cross the lane in an angle as close to 90 degrees as possible.

TSSs are used to regulate the traffic at busy, confined waterways or around capes. Within a TSS there is normally at least one traffic-lane in each main-direction, turning-points, deep-water lanes and separation zones between the main traffic lanes. Most TSS schemes include 'inshore traffic zones' between the traffic-lanes and the coast. The inshore traffic zone is unregulated and is not intended to be used for through traffic but rather for local traffic, fishing and small craft. A ship navigating in a traffic-lane should sail in the general direction of that lane. The body of water between two opposite lanes is to be avoided by vessels travelling within the TSS as far as possible except in certain circumstances such as emergencies or for fishing activities. Where needed there are special zones where a lane splits into two channels: one ongoing and the other to the nearby port(s).

The TSS rules are incorporated in the International Regulations for Preventing Collisions at Sea (Under Part B, Section I, Rule 10- Traffic Separation Schemes). An individual TSS is controlled by a vessel traffic service.

Objectives 
Objectives of IMO Routeing Schemes:
  Help reduce and manage head on situations for the streams of opposing traffic
  Help manage crossing situation arising while entering or coming out of port
  In areas of offshore activities, directives regarding safe distance from the installations
  Providing routes for deep draught vessels
  Avoiding presence of routine traffic from some areas as desired by administration
  Better management of inshore traffic zone, fishing zones and areas dangerous to navigation due to presence of isolated dangers and shoal patches in a high density traffic area.

Crossing

If a ship wants to cross a traffic-lane it should do so at a right angle to avoid  endangering ship traffic using the traffic-lanes (although traffic in the lane does not automatically have the right-of-way). To minimize the amount of time a crossing ship spend crossing the traffic-lanes, there should be a right angle between the lane direction and the keel direction – even if currents might shift the actual direction of the ship's movement to some angle other than 90 degrees.

Locations

TSSs are used in locations where there is a lot of traffic (busy shipping areas) where not regulating the traffic would lead to more accidents. In Europe, many TSS areas are found around the Southern part of the North Sea including the English Channel. Other TSSs are in place off Land's End and around Ouessant (Ushant).

Well-known TSS locations include the English Channel, German Bight, Singapore, and Cape Horn. The Dover Strait/Détroit du Pas de Calais was the first
International Maritime Organisation (IMO) approved traffic separation scheme in the world in 1967.

Other TSS areas can be found in the Mediterranean Sea, western side of the Atlantic Ocean and the Pacific.

See also
Oswego-Guardian/Texanita collision
Vessel traffic service

References

 TSS in the Channel chartlet published by the British Maritime and Coastguard Agency
IMO, Ships' routeing
Article 10 of the anti-collision rules of the German Water and Shipping Authority 

Law of the sea
Navigation